Condensin complex subunit 2 also known as chromosome-associated protein H (CAP-H) or non-SMC condensin I complex subunit H (NCAPH) is a protein that in humans is encoded by the NCAPH gene. CAP-H is a subunit of condensin I, a large protein complex involved in chromosome condensation

Function 

CAP-H is a member of the barr protein family and a regulatory subunit of the condensin complex. This complex is required for the conversion of interphase chromatin into condensed chromosomes. CAP-H is associated with mitotic chromosomes, except during the early phase of chromosome condensation. During interphase, the protein has a distinct punctate nucleolar localization.

Model organisms				

Model organisms have been used in the study of NCAPH function. A conditional knockout mouse line, called Ncaphtm1a(EUCOMM)Wtsi was generated as part of the International Knockout Mouse Consortium program — a high-throughput mutagenesis project to generate and distribute animal models of disease to interested scientists.

Male and female animals underwent a standardized phenotypic screen to determine the effects of deletion. Twenty four tests were carried out on mutant mice and three significant abnormalities were observed. No homozygous mutant embryos were identified during gestation, and therefore none survived until weaning. The remaining tests were carried out on heterozygous mutant adult mice and an increased susceptibility to bacterial infection was observed in male animals.

References

Further reading 

 
 
 
 
 
 
 

Human proteins
Genes mutated in mice